Port of Oulu (Oulun satama in Finnish) is a complex of three separate harbours located at the mouth of Oulujoki river in Oulu, Finland. Port of Oulu is a corporation owned by the City of Oulu. Annual average of 3 million tons of cargo is shipped on 500 vessels. Two of the ports, Nuottasaari and Oritkari, are also rail-served.

Harbours in Port of Oulu

Vihreäsaari oil and bulk docks
Vihreäsaari oil docks on Vihreäsaari island, on the north bank of Oulujoki river is the most important oil dock in the city, with a maximum allowed draught of 10.0m. In addition to oil handling facilities there are six-ton bulk cranes in Vihreäsaari. The harbour was opened in 1963

Nuottasaari docks
Located next to the Stora Enso paper mill on the south bank of the river is the Nuottasaari docks with three separate piers: the main pier and two separate chemical piers. Maximum allowed draught in 6.4m. Two cranes of 8-ton and 6-ton capacities are in service. The harbour was opened in 1953

Oritkari docks
There are two 50-ton cranes at the Oritkari docks. Oritkari mainly handles container freight through its three piers. The harbour was opened in 1970.

Historical harbours

Toppila docks
Toppila docks were located on both sides of the Toppilansalmi strait in the Toppilansaari and Toppila districts. Once a busy harbour, Toppila was closed from commercial traffic at the end of April 2012. Before the closure Toppila was a quiet harbour mainly used by bulk carriers. There were no fixed crane on the 450-metre pier and most of harbour activity had ceased already during the 1990s. Entire former harbour area has been zoned for apartment buildings.

References

External links

 Port of Oulu website



Transport in Oulu
Oulu
Buildings and structures in Oulu